Lepa Ves (Croatian for Beautiful village) is a village in Croatia.

References

Populated places in Krapina-Zagorje County